In mathematics, especially in combinatorics, Stirling numbers of the first kind arise in the study of permutations.  In particular, the Stirling numbers of the first kind count permutations according to their number of cycles (counting fixed points as cycles of length one).

The Stirling numbers of the first and second kind can be understood as inverses of one another when viewed as triangular matrices. This article is devoted to specifics of Stirling numbers of the first kind. Identities linking the two kinds appear in the article on Stirling numbers in general.

Definitions
The original definition of Stirling numbers of the first kind was algebraic: they are the coefficients  in the expansion of the falling factorial

into powers of the variable :

Subsequently, it was discovered that the absolute values  of these numbers are equal to the number of permutations of certain kinds. They may be defined directly to be the number of permutations of  elements with  disjoint cycles.
It was observed by Alfréd Rényi that the unsigned Stirling number   also count the number 
of permutations of size  with  left-to-right maxima.

The unsigned Stirling numbers may also be defined algebraically, as the coefficients of the rising factorial:
.

The notations used on this page for Stirling numbers are not universal, and may conflict with notations in other sources.  (The square bracket notation  is also common notation for the Gaussian coefficients.)

Definition by permutation
 can be defined as the number of permutations on  elements with  cycles.
The image at right shows that : the symmetric group on 4 objects has 3 permutations of the form

 (having 2 orbits, each of size 2),

and 8 permutations of the form

 (having 1 orbit of size 3 and 1 orbit of size 1).

These numbers can be calculated by considering the orbits as conjugancy classes (last bullet point).

Signs
In particular,

Recurrence relation
The unsigned Stirling numbers of the first kind can be calculated by the recurrence relation

 

It follows immediately that the (signed) Stirling numbers of the first kind satisfy the recurrence

 .

Table of values

Below is a triangular array of unsigned values for the Stirling numbers of the first kind, similar in form to Pascal's triangle.  These values are easy to generate using the recurrence relation in the previous section.

Properties

Simple identities
Note that although

we have  if n > 0

and

 if k > 0, or more generally  if k > n.

Also

and

Similar relationships involving the Stirling numbers hold for the Bernoulli polynomials.  Many relations for the Stirling numbers shadow similar relations on the binomial coefficients.  The study of these 'shadow relationships' is termed umbral calculus and culminates in the theory of Sheffer sequences. Generalizations of the Stirling numbers of both kinds to arbitrary complex-valued inputs may be extended through the relations of these triangles to the Stirling convolution polynomials.

Therefore if  is prime, then:

Other relations

Expansions for fixed k

Since the Stirling numbers are the coefficients of a polynomial with roots 0, 1, ..., one has by Vieta's formulas that

In other words, the Stirling numbers of the first kind are given by elementary symmetric polynomials evaluated at 0, 1, ..., .  In this form, the simple identities given above take the form

and so on.

One may produce alternative forms for the Stirling numbers of the first kind with a similar approach preceded by some algebraic manipulation: since

it follows from Newton's formulas that one can expand the Stirling numbers of the first kind in terms of generalized harmonic numbers.  This yields identities like

where Hn is the harmonic number  and Hn(m) is the generalized harmonic number

These relations can be generalized to give

where w(n, m) is defined recursively in terms of the generalized harmonic numbers by
 

For fixed  these weighted harmonic number expansions are generated by the generating function

More generally, sums related to these weighted harmonic number expansions of the Stirling numbers of the first kind can be defined through generalized zeta series transforms of generating functions.

One can also "invert" the relations for these Stirling numbers given in terms of the -order harmonic numbers to write the integer-order generalized harmonic numbers in terms of weighted sums of terms involving the Stirling numbers of the first kind. For example, when  the second-order and third-order harmonic numbers are given by

More generally, one can invert the Bell polynomial generating function for the Stirling numbers expanded in terms of the -order harmonic numbers to obtain that for integers

Factorial-related sums

For all positive integer m and n, one has

where  is the rising factorial. This formula is a dual of Spivey's result for the Bell numbers.

Other related formulas involving the falling factorials, Stirling numbers of the first kind, and in some cases Stirling numbers of the second kind include the following:

Inversion relations and the Stirling transform

for all integers , we have a corresponding inversion formula for  given by

These inversion relations between the two sequences translate into functional equations between the sequence exponential generating functions given by the Stirling (generating function) transform as

and

Another pair of "inversion" relations involving the Stirling numbers relate the forward differences and the ordinary  derivatives of a function, which is analytic for all  by the formulas

Congruences

The following congruence identity may be proved via a generating function-based approach:

More recent results providing Jacobi-type J-fractions that generate the single factorial function and generalized factorial-related products lead to other new congruence results for the Stirling numbers of the first kind.
For example, working modulo  we can prove that

and working modulo  we can similarly prove that

More generally, for fixed integers  if we define the ordered roots

then we may expand congruences for these Stirling numbers defined as the coefficients

in the following form where the functions, denote fixed 

Section 6.2 of the reference cited above provides more explicit expansions related to these congruences for the -order harmonic numbers and for the generalized factorial products, . In the previous examples, the notation  denotes Iverson's convention.

Generating functions
A variety of identities may be derived by manipulating the generating function (see change of basis):

Using the equality

it follows that

(This identity is valid for formal power series, and the sum converges in the complex plane for |z| < 1.) Other identities arise by exchanging the order of summation, taking derivatives, making substitutions for z or u, etc.  For example, we may derive:

and

or

and

where  is the gamma function. There also exist more complicated expressions for the zeta-functions involving the Stirling numbers. One, for example, has

This series generalizes Hasse's series for the Hurwitz zeta-function (we obtain Hasse's series by setting k=1).

Asymptotics

The next estimate given in terms of the Euler gamma constant applies:

For fixed  we have the following estimate as :

We can also apply the saddle point asymptotic methods from Temme's article  to obtain other estimates for the Stirling numbers of the first kind. These estimates are more involved and complicated to state. Nonetheless, we provide an example. 
In particular, we define the log gamma function, whose higher-order derivatives are given in terms of polygamma functions as

where we consider the (unique) saddle point  of the function to be the solution of  when .

we have the following asymptotic estimate as :

Finite sums
Since permutations are partitioned by number of cycles, one has

The identity

can be proved by the techniques on the page
Stirling numbers and exponential generating functions.

The table in section 6.1 of Concrete Mathematics provides a plethora of generalized forms of finite sums involving the Stirling numbers. Several particular finite sums relevant to this article include

Other finite sum identities involving the signed Stirling numbers of the first kind found, for example, in the NIST Handbook of Mathematical Functions (Section 26.8) include the following sums:

Additionally, if we define the second-order Eulerian numbers by the triangular recurrence relation 

we arrive at the following identity related to the form of the Stirling convolution polynomials which can be employed to generalize both Stirling number triangles to arbitrary real, or complex-valued, values of the input :

Particular expansions of the previous identity lead to the following identities expanding the Stirling numbers of the first kind for the first few small values of :

Software tools for working with finite sums involving Stirling numbers and Eulerian numbers are provided by the RISC Stirling.m package utilities in Mathematica. Other software packages for guessing formulas for sequences (and polynomial sequence sums) involving Stirling numbers and other special triangles is available for both Mathematica and Sage here and here, respectively.

Furthermore,  infinite series involving the finite sums with the Stirling numbers often lead to the special functions. For example

or

and

or even

where γm are the Stieltjes constants and δm,0 represents the Kronecker delta function.

Explicit formula
The Stirling number s(n,n-p) can be found from the formula

where   The sum is a sum over all partitions of p.

In particular, we see that

Newton's identities combined with the above expansions may be used to give an alternate proof of the weighted expansions involving the generalized harmonic numbers already noted above.

Another explicit formula for reciprocal powers of n is given by the following identity for integers :

Notice that this last identity immediately implies relations between the polylogarithm functions, the Stirling number exponential generating functions given above, and the Stirling-number-based power series for the generalized Nielsen polylogarithm functions.

Relations to natural logarithm function 
The nth derivative of the μth power of the natural logarithm involves the signed Stirling numbers of the first kind:

where is the falling factorial, and is the signed Stirling number.

It can be proved by using mathematical induction.

Generalizations

There are many notions of generalized Stirling numbers that may be defined (depending on application) in a number of differing combinatorial contexts. In so much as the Stirling numbers of the first kind correspond to the coefficients of the distinct polynomial expansions of the single factorial function, we may extend this notion to define triangular recurrence relations for more general classes of products.

In particular, for any fixed arithmetic function  and symbolic parameters , related generalized factorial products of the form

These coefficients satisfy a number of analogous properties to those for the Stirling numbers of the first kind as well as recurrence relations and functional equations related to the f-harmonic numbers, .

The Stirling numbers of both kinds, the binomial coefficients, and the first and second-order Eulerian numbers are all defined by special cases of a triangular super-recurrence of the form

In this sense, the form of the Stirling numbers of the first kind may also be generalized by this parameterized super-recurrence for fixed scalars  (not all zero).

See also
 Stirling polynomials
 Stirling numbers
 Stirling numbers of the second kind
 Random permutation statistics

References

 The Art of Computer Programming
 Concrete Mathematics
 
 .
 

Permutations
Factorial and binomial topics
Triangles of numbers
Operations on numbers

pl:Liczby Stirlinga#Liczby Stirlinga I rodzaju